The World Series of Poker Tournament of Champions is an invitational freeroll poker event.  Wins in this event do not count as official WSOP bracelets, but the winner receives a large trophy in the shape of the official World Series of Poker logo.  In 2010, the WSOP Tournament of Champions returned with a new format more akin to a typical sports league All-Star Event format.  27 players vied for $1 million, with 20 of those players selected by the fans via online vote at the WSOP's website.

Results

2004
The first event took place on 1 September 2004 with invitations only being extended to ten of the most well-known names on the poker tournament circuit at the time. The winner took home a $2,000,000 prize. No other participants received prize money.

2005
The 2005 event took place between November 6 and November 8 at Caesars Palace in Las Vegas.
Prior to the event, Harrah's advertised that to qualify a player would need to reach the final table of the 2005 World Series of Poker $10,000 no limit Texas hold 'em championship event, or win any World Series of Poker Circuit event.

Controversy erupted however when Pepsi, the event's sponsor, insisted that Phil Hellmuth, Doyle Brunson, and Johnny Chan be granted Sponsor Exemptions. Despite public protests from other players that they were lied to as the event was billed as one that one had to qualify for, ESPN and Harrah's newly hired Vice President of Sports and Entertainment Marketing, Jeffrey Pollack allowed the three to participate.  Hellmuth finished third, while Chan and Brunson missed the final table, coming in 13th and 10th, respectively.

From 2006 onward, Harrah's reserved the right to let in up to six players via sponsor's exemptions.

2006
The 2006 field of twenty-seven players included the 9 players who made the final table of the 2005 World Series of Poker main event, the winners of the 11 WSOP Circuit events in the preceding calendar year, and some sponsor exemptions. 

Other qualifiers and invitees
2005 World Series of Poker Main Event Final Table Players:
 Joe Hachem
 Steve Dannenmann
 John "Tex" Barch
 Aaron Kanter
 Scott Lazar
 Brad Kondracki

WSOP Circuit Event Winners:
 Gregg Merkow (Grand Casino Tunica)
 Vinny Vinh (Caesars Indiana)
 Abraham Korotki (Harrah's Atlantic City)
 Jeffrey King (Caesars Atlantic City)
 John Spadavecchia (Caesars Palace)
 Peter Feldman (Harrah's New Orleans)
 Clint Baskin (Harrah's Lake Tahoe)

Sponsor Exemptions:
 Doyle Brunson
 Gus Hansen
 Phil Hellmuth
 Mike O'Malley
 Sarah Strom  (contest winner)

2007
Harrah's put the Tournament of Champions on hold indefinitely.

2010
On March 15, 2010, Harrah's and the World Series of Poker announced that the WSOP Tournament of Champions would return on June 27, 2010 when 27 players  competed in a freeroll for $1 million in prize money.  The new format is an All-Star Event format, where the public decided which players participated in the event from a list of 521 current WSOP bracelet-holders.

The public decided the 20 players via an online vote at www.WSOP.com/TOC. Voting was open from March 15, 2010 until midnight ET on June 15, 2010.
Voted in were: Phil Ivey, Daniel Negreanu, Doyle Brunson, Phil Hellmuth, Chris Ferguson, Allen Cunningham, Johnny Chan, Scotty Nguyen, Barry Greenstein, John Juanda, Erik Seidel, Jennifer Harman, Huck Seed, Dan Harrington, T. J. Cloutier, Sammy Farha, Howard Lederer, Greg Raymer, Joe Hachem and Antonio Esfandiari.

Five of the seats were automatically awarded.  The reigning WSOP Champion Joe Cada, the reigning WSOP Europe Champion Barry Shulman and the three previous TOC winners: Annie Duke, Mike Matusow and Mike Sexton.

The remaining two seats were awarded as sponsor exemptions by Harrah's, to Andrew Barton and Bertrand "Elky" Grospellier.

On June 27, the 27 players began play in the Amazon Room at the Rio All-Suite Hotel & Casino in Las Vegas. The final nine players returned to play the final table on July 4, 2010 in the same location.

References

External links
Article on 2005 event by Daniel Negreanu
Entry on 2005 event from Paul Phillips' blog
Veni, Vidi, Vici! (coverage of 2005 event)

World Series of Poker